Steven Lee "Buzz" Busby (born September 29, 1949) is a former starting pitcher in Major League Baseball who played his entire career for the Kansas City Royals. He batted and threw right-handed.

High school
Busby attended Fullerton Union High School in Fullerton, CA.

Professional career
A bright prospect, Busby won 56 games in his first three full seasons, only to have his career derailed by a rotator cuff tear. Busby became the first no-hit pitcher who did not come to bat during the entire game, with the American League having adopted the designated hitter rule that year.

In a game against the California Angels on September 20, 1972, Busby hit a grand slam only to have it taken back by the first base umpire John Rice who said time out had been called to eject Jerry May. Nonetheless, Busby went on to hit a double and two singles in the game, while also earning the victory on the mound.

In , Busby enjoyed his best season, winning 22 games and making the American League All-Star team. He also pitched a second no-hitter on June 19, this one against the Milwaukee Brewers at County Stadium. Yielding only a second-inning walk to George Scott, Busby defeated the Brewers 2–0, besting Clyde Wright—himself a no-hit pitcher in 1970. With this no-hitter, Busby became the first pitcher in major-league history to throw no-hitters in each of his first two complete seasons. In  he won 18 games and made the All-Star team again.

Busby had struggled with his control early in his career, but his problems returned to a greater degree in  when he was diagnosed with a torn rotator cuff; an injury that at the time ended a pitcher's career.  Busby subsequently became the first baseball player to undergo rotator cuff surgery.  In an effort to help his arm recover from the surgery, his doctor recommended that Busby be placed on a pitch count.  He is often believed to be the first baseball player to be placed on a pitch count, something that Busby has stated is a myth.  Before his injury, he is alleged to have thrown close to 200 pitches in a game, which Busby also says is untrue.

Unfortunately for Busby, the surgery did not save his career. In  he even pitched a one-hitter, but otherwise pitched ineffectively, compiling a 6.17 ERA and allowing 80 baserunners in 42.1 innings. He pitched his final game on August 26 and the Royals released him three days later. Busby signed a contract with the St. Louis Cardinals before the  season, but never pitched in the major leagues again.

In an eight-year career, Busby posted a 70–54 record with 659 strikeouts and a 3.72 ERA in 1060.2 innings.

Busby and outfielder Amos Otis were the first two players elected to the Royals Hall of Fame. In 2009, Busby was elected to the Missouri Sports Hall of Fame. His 70 career victories ranks him ninth on the Royals' all-time list.

Broadcasting career
Following the end of his playing career, Busby became a sportscaster, primarily for the Texas Rangers, and has also worked as an instructor at a baseball school. Unlike most former players, Busby acts as both a play-by-play man and a color commentator, and traded positions with Eric Nadel on radio broadcasts. After replacing Dave Barnett as television play-by-play announcer in the middle of the 2012 season, Busby had been working exclusively on play-by-play, with Tom Grieve on color. However, in October 2016, the Rangers announced that Busby would not be returning for the 2017 season. Dave Raymond has replaced Busby for the 2017 season.

References

External links

Steve Busby at SABR (Baseball BioProject)
Steve Busby at Pura Pelota (Venezuelan Professional Baseball League)

1949 births
Living people
American League All-Stars
Baseball players from California
Daytona Beach Islanders players
Gulf Coast Royals players
Kansas City Royals announcers
Kansas City Royals players
Major League Baseball broadcasters
Major League Baseball pitchers
Omaha Royals players
Orlando Juice players
Sportspeople from Burbank, California
San Jose Bees players
Texas Rangers (baseball) announcers
Tiburones de La Guaira players
American expatriate baseball players in Venezuela
University of Southern California alumni
USC Trojans baseball players
All-American college baseball players